Lie to Me is a 2009-2011 American television series.

Lie to Me may also refer to:

Film and television
 Lie to Me (2011 TV series), a South Korean drama series
 "Lie to Me" (Buffy the Vampire Slayer), an episode of Buffy the Vampire Slayer
 Lie to Me (film) or Fling, a 2008 film directed by John Stewart Muller

Music

Albums
 Lie to Me (album) or the title song, by Jonny Lang, 1997

Songs
 "Lie to Me" (5 Seconds of Summer song), 2018
 "Lie to Me" (Bon Jovi song), 1995
 "Lie to Me" (Bret Michaels song), 2010
 "Lie to Me" (Cole Plante song), 2013
 "Lie to Me" (Gary Barlow song), 1999
 "Lie to Me" (Mikolas Josef song), represented the Czech Republic in the Eurovision Song Contest 2018
 "Lie to Me" (Tate McRae and Ali Gatie song), 2020
 "Lie to Me" (Vera Blue song), 2020
 "Lie to Me (Denial)", by Red, 2011
 "Lie to Me", by 12 Stones from Anthem for the Underdog
 "Lie to Me", by Brook Benton, 1962
 "Lie to Me", by Bryan Adams from On a Day Like Today
 "Lie to Me", by Cher from Closer to the Truth
 "Lie to Me", by Chris Isaak from Chris Isaak
 "Lie to Me", by Daniel Powter from Daniel Powter
 "Lie to Me", by David Byrne from Rei Momo
 "Lie to Me", by Depeche Mode from Some Great Reward
 "Lie to Me", by George Nozuka
 "Lie to Me", by McLean
 "Lie to Me", by Meghan Trainor from the album Treat Myself
 "Lie to Me", by Ne-Yo from Year of the Gentleman
 "Lie to Me", by Rob Thomas from The Great Unknown
 "Lie to Me", by Sara Bareilles from Once Upon Another Time
 "Lie to Me", by Sia from Music – Songs from and Inspired by the Motion Picture
 "Lie to Me", by Silverchair from Freak Show
 "Lie to Me", by Steve Aoki from Neon Future III
 "Lie to Me", by Tired Lion from the album Breakfast for Pathetics
 "Lie to Me", by Tom Waits from Orphans: Brawlers, Bawlers & Bastards
 "Lie to Me", by The Wanted from Battleground